The Apache is a 1925 British silent drama film directed by and starring Adelqui Migliar. It also features Mona Maris and Jameson Thomas. It is a Paris-set melodrama. The title refers to the Apache dance popularly associated with the city during the era.

Cast
 Adelqui Migliar as The Panther  
 Mona Maris as Lisette Blanchard  
 Jameson Thomas as Gaston d'Harcourt 
 Jerrold Robertshaw as Albert d'Harcourt  
 Roger San Juana as Mario  
 James Carrasco as Gaspard 
 Doris Mansell as Armande

References

Bibliography
 Low, Rachael. The History of the British Film 1918-1929. George Allen & Unwin, 1971.

External links

1925 films
1925 drama films
British drama films
British silent feature films
Films directed by Adelqui Migliar
Films set in Paris
British black-and-white films
1920s English-language films
1920s British films
Silent drama films